The history of cricket in Pakistan predates the creation of the country in 1947. The first international cricket match in what is now Pakistan today was held in Karachi on 22 November 1935 between Sindh and Australia (see Figure 1). The match was seen by 5,000 Karachiites. Cricket was introduced by the British during their colonial rule of British India, which covered the area now known as Pakistan. Cricket is the most popular sport in the country. The Pakistan Cricket Board controls all domestic cricket in Pakistan and the national teams. Pakistan is an official member of the International Cricket Council and the Asian Cricket Council. Pakistan has won the Cricket World Cup in 1992, ICC T20 World Cup in 2009, the ICC Champions Trophy in 2017, the ICC Under-19 Cricket World Cup in 2004 and 2006, the ACC Asia Cup in 2000 and 2012, and the ICC Test Championship in 2016.

Organisation and history

The Pakistan Cricket Board governs all official domestic tournaments. Pakistan is also an official member of the International Cricket Council and the Asian Cricket Council. Almost all cities and villages in Pakistan have their own cricket teams and unofficial tournaments. Pakistani children start playing cricket at a young age. 

The game is the most popular sport in the country with the tape ball variety of the game being the most common. A tape ball is a tennis ball wrapped in electrical tape and is used in playing backyard cricket. This modification of the tennis ball gives it greater weight, speed and distance while still being easier to play with than the conventional cricket ball. The variation was pioneered in Karachi, Pakistan and is credited with Pakistan's famous production of fast bowlers as children are brought up playing the game using a tape ball in which various skills are developed. The increasing popularity of the tape ball in informal, local cricket has transformed the way games are played in cricket-loving nations such as India, Sri Lanka, and Bangladesh but most famously Pakistan. Such has been the impact of tape ball that in recent years some companies have introduced tennis balls designed to act like cricket balls. These balls are quite popular in South Asia where tape ball cricket is one of the most popular forms of the sport.

Professional cricket has been played in Pakistan since its formation in 1947: 
History of cricket in Pakistan from 1947 to 1970
History of cricket in Pakistan from 1971 to 1985
History of cricket in Pakistan from 1986 to 2000
History of cricket in Pakistan from 2001

International cricket

Cricket is considered the most popular sport in Pakistan. After the partition of India in 1947 and the formation of Pakistan, Pakistan played its first official match in 1952 under the captaincy of Abdul Kardar against the republic of India in 1952 registering their first Test victory in Lucknow. Women's cricket developed later in Pakistan with the women's national team playing their first match in 1997. 

The national cricket team of Pakistan is governed by the Pakistan Cricket Board (PCB) - a permanent member of the International Cricket Council (ICC). Pakistan national teams regularly participate in international home and away series - with the major series being against arch-rival India. In addition, the Pakistan men's national team participates in the following major international tournaments:
 ICC ODI Cricket World Cup (ODI): Inaugural Tournament and Debut in 1975
 ICC T20 Cricket World Cup (T20I): Inaugural Tournament and Debut in 2007
 ACC Asia Cup (ODI & T20I): Inaugural Tournament and Debut in 1984
 ICC Champions Trophy (ODI): Inaugural Tournament and Debut in 1998
 ICC World Test Championship (Test): Inaugural Tournament and Debut in 2019/21 
 ICC Test Championship (Test): Inauguration and Debut in 2003

Pakistan men's national team has had success on the international stage having a best international ranking of 1st in the Test, ODI and T20I cricket. In terms of tournament success:
 ICC ODI Cricket World Cup: Champions in 1992
 ICC T20 Cricket World Cup: Champions in 2009
 ICC Champions Trophy: Champions in 2017
 ACC Asia Cup: Champions in 2000 & 2012
 ICC World Test Championship: N/A 
 ICC Test Championship: Mace Holders in 2016

From 2009 to 2019 Pakistan was unable to host international matches in Pakistan after the terror attack on the touring Sri Lanka cricket team. This decade led to little or no international cricket taking place in Pakistan and Pakistan played its home series in the UAE (specifically Dubai and Abu Dhabi).  As the security situation improved, in September 2019, international test cricket returned to Pakistan with the visit of Sri Lanka. By the end of 2022, almost all the leading Test playing nations had toured the country again. The 2023 ACC Asia Cup and the 2025 ICC Champions Trophy are scheduled to be held in Pakistan.

The Pakistan women's national cricket team has had moderate success on the international stage and is in development. However, the team is regularly ranked in the top 10 in the world. Thus far the women's national team has not won an ICC or ACC international tournament.

Domestic cricket

The structure of domestic cricket in Pakistan at the highest level has changed many times since 1947 with the latest restructure being in 2019. Previously domestic cricket operated with departmental, city and regional teams - a set up encouraged by Abdul Hafeez Kardar. Since 1947, the domestic first class cricket system has varied considerably per year with teams ranging from 7 to 26 and tournament matches operating under different formats (often changes occurred every year). With the advent of domestic List A and T20 forms of cricket in the 1970s and 2000s, there has been no consistent set up (as has been noted for first class cricket in Pakistan). Historically, school and club cricket has also suffered due to inconsistencies in top tier domestic cricket. The consistent changes in the domestic structure and the gradual introduction of departmental teams was encouraged as it provided permanent jobs to players. Matches were rarely televised due to lack of quality cricket and lack of interest in departmental cricket. This inconsistent system was widely criticised on the basis of low quality cricket and reduced competition. 

In 2019, six regional teams were created on provincial lines. The teams would compete in the principal competitions in all three forms of the game: the Quaid-e-Azam Trophy (First Class), Pakistan Cup (List A) and National T20 Cup (Domestic T20). The PCB's rationale in reducing the number of teams in domestic cricket was to concentrate talent in order to increase competition and improve the quality of cricket. The new structure also consisted of corresponding second XI, under-19, under-16 and under-13 competitions, and live television coverage of top level matches. The restructuring also reorganised district level cricket into a three tier bottom-up system, with 90 city cricket associations supervising school and club cricket at grassroots level, and inter-city tournaments providing a stepping-stone to the six elite regional teams. The three tier bottom-up system can be summarised as follows

The six regional teams (operated by respective six cricket associations) ensure that the affairs of the associations at city level are regulated. They frame policies that will develop cricket at the grassroots, manage club cricket in collaboration with the 90 city associations and also oversee intra-city competitions. The teams are responsible for revenue generation through sponsorship, marketing and strategic collaborations with business conglomerates. Each of the six regional teams have a chief executive officer and a management committee that has been tasked with supervising all cricketing activities. These changes have been made by the PCB in order to decentralise the administrative body so that it can limit itself to a supervisory role by delegating responsibilities related to the development of the sport to the provincial associations. This tiered structure has been enshrined in the PCB constitution.

An nationwide inter-city franchise T20 tournament, the Pakistan Super League, was inaugurated in 2016. In 2021, a franchise T20 tournament based in Kashmir was launched, titled the Kashmir Premier League.

Regional domestic tournaments
The main regional domestic cricket tournaments in Pakistan for men are contested by six elite regional teams with the cricket season starting in October and concluding in March. Second XI teams of the six regional teams compete in parallel competitions, and there are age group pathway tournaments at national, regional and local level. The elite tournaments are: 
 Quaid-e-Azam Trophy (First Class): Duration two to three months.
 Pakistan Cup (List A): Duration one month.
 National T20 Cup (T20): Duration one month.

Women's domestic cricket tournaments take place between four teams. The main elite tournaments are:  
 Pakistan Women's One Day Cup (List A)
 PCB Triangular Twenty20 Women's Tournament (T20)

Franchise tournaments
The main franchise domestic T20 cricket tournaments in Pakistan are:
 Pakistan Super League (city-based and countrywide)
 Pakistan Junior League (city-based and countrywide)
 The Women's League (city-based and countrywide)
 Kashmir Premier League (city-based within Kashmir region)

Cricket stadiums

Pakistan is home to several cricket stadiums with the major/popular cricket stadiums (by province/territory) being as follows:

Sindh
Karachi: National Stadium
Rafi Stadium (Under Construction - Planned 2022)
Hyderabad: Niaz Stadium

Punjab
Lahore: Gadaffi Stadium
Multan: Multan Cricket Stadium
Rawalpindi: Rawalpindi Cricket Stadium
Faisalabad: Iqbal Stadium

Khyber Pakhtunkhwa
Peshawar: Arbab Niaz Stadium
Abbottabad: Abbottabad Cricket Stadium

Balochistan
Quetta: Bugti Stadium
Gwadar: Gwadar Cricket Stadium

Azad Kashmir
Mirpur: Quaid-e-Azam Stadium
Muzaffarabad: Muzaffarabad Cricket Stadium

Gilgit-Baltistan
Gilgit: Pissan Cricket Stadium

Notable players

 Abdul Qadir
 Wasim Akram
 Javed Miandad
 Imran Khan
 Waqar Younis
 Inzamam-ul-haq
 Shoaib Akhtar
 Misbah-ul-Haq
 Saeed Anwar
 Shahid Afridi
 Shoaib Malik
 Umar Gul
 Younis Khan
 Rameez Raja
 Aamir Sohail
 Saqlain Mushtaq
 Saeed Ajmal
 Abdul Razzaq
 Muhammad Sami
 Mohammad Rizwan
 Azhar Ali
 Mohammad Hafeez
 Yasir Shah
 Ahmed Shehzad
 Mohammad Irfan
 Wahab Riaz
 Kamran Akmal
 Imran Farhat
 Yasir Hameed
 Junaid Khan
 Sohail Tanvir
 Umar Akmal
 Zulfiqar Babar
 Nasir Jamshed
 Babar Azam
 Fawad Alam
 Mohammad Amir
 Fakhar Zaman
 Shadab Khan
 Abdul Razzaq
 Naseem Shah
 Shaheen Shah Afridi
 Sarfraz Ahmed
 Haris Rauf

See also
 Sport in Pakistan

References

External links